The following is a list of film directors from Italy.

A

Giuseppe Adami
Antonio Albanese
Marcello Albani
Giorgio Albertazzi
Adalberto Albertini
Filoteo Alberini
Goffredo Alessandrini
Ottavio Alessi
Mario Almirante
Silvio Amadio
Giuseppe Amato
Arturo Ambrosio
Gianni Amelio
Mario Amendola
Tony Amendola
Roberto Amoroso
Franco Amurri
Roberto Andò
Raffaele Andreassi
Marcello Andrei
Alfredo Angeli
Edoardo Anton
Michelangelo Antonioni
Renzo Arbore
Francesca Archibugi
Asia Argento
Dario Argento
Lello Arena
Ovidio Gabriele Assonitis
Antonio Attanasio
Pupi Avati

B

Gianfranco Baldanello
Ferdinando Baldi
Gian Vittorio Baldi
Marcello Baldi
Piero Ballerini
Luca Barbareschi
Umberto Barbaro
Enzo Barboni
Francesco Barilli
Ivo Barnabò Micheli
Carlo Barsotti
Elio Bartolini
Andrea Barzini
Maria Basaglia
Giulio Base
Franco Battiato
Giacomo Battiato
Luigi Batzella
Lamberto Bava
Mario Bava
Camillo Bazzoni
Luigi Bazzoni
Marco Bechis
Ila Bêka
Marco Bellocchio
Carmelo Bene
Roberto Benigni
Giuseppe Bennati
Stefano Benni
Alessandro Benvenuti
Paolo Benvenuti
Sergio Bergonzelli
Giuliana Berlinguer
Franco Bernini
Giulio Berruti
Bernardo Bertolucci
Giuseppe Bertolucci
Alberto Bevilacqua
Giuliano Biagetti
Enzo Biagi
Adelchi Bianchi
Andrea Bianchi
Giorgio Bianchi
Roberto Bianchi Montero
Paolo Bianchini
Ferruccio Biancini
Oreste Biancoli
Antonio Bido
Gianni Bisiach
Alessandro Blasetti
Silverio Blasi
Tanio Boccia
Sandro Bolchi
Mauro Bolognini
Adriano Bolzoni
Enrico Bomba
Gianni Bongioanni
Claudio Bonivento
Mario Bonnard
Alberto Bonucci
Carlo Borghesio
Ruth Borgobello
Cristiano Bortone
Franco Bottari
Bruno Bozzetto
Anton Giulio Bragaglia
Carlo Ludovico Bragaglia
Tinto Brass
Rossano Brazzi
Mario Brenta
Alfonso Brescia
Enrico Brignano
Guido Brignone
Edith Bruck
Franco Brusati
Ninni Bruschetta
Aldo Buzzi

C

Mario Caiano
Jerry Calà
Claudio Caligari
Francesco Calogero
Mimmo Calopresti
Alfio Caltabiano
Flavio Calzavara
Mario Camerini
Giacomo Campiotti
Carlo Campogalliani
Cesare Canevari
Giorgio Capitani
Alessandro Capone
Vittorio Caprioli
Antonio Capuano
Luigi Capuano
Alberto Cardone
Carlo Carlei
Giuliano Carnimeo
Fabio Carpi
Pier Carpi
Jonas Carpignano
Mario Caserini
Stefania Casini
Riccardo Cassano
Renato Castellani
Franco Castellano
Sergio Castellitto
Arnaldo Catinari
Alberto Cavallone
Liliana Cavani
Paolo Cavara
Massimo Ceccherini
Guido Celano
Adriano Celentano
Adolfo Celi
Fernando Cerchio
Ferruccio Cerio
Ennio Cerlesi
Tonino Cervi
Piero Chiambretti
Luigi Chiarini
Carlo Alberto Chiesa
Guido Chiesa
Nando Cicero
Tano Cimarosa
Beppe Cino
Marcello Ciorciolini
Daniele Ciprì
Franco Citti
Sergio Citti
Osvaldo Civirani
Giancarlo Cobelli
Duilio Coletti
Giuseppe Colizzi
Cristina Comencini
Francesca Comencini
Luigi Comencini
Jacopo Comin
Bruno Corbucci
Sergio Corbucci
Emilio Cordero
Pappi Corsicato
Leonardo Cortese
Mario Costa
Maurizio Costanzo
Saverio Costanzo
Vittorio Cottafavi
Tizza Covi
Luigi Cozzi
Mario Craveri
Armando Crispino
Giorgio Cristallini
Carlo Croccolo

D

Antonio D'Agostino
Alessandro D'Alatri
Angelo D'Alessandro
Massimo Dallamano
Renato Dall'Ara
Enzo D'Alò
Damiano Damiani
Luigi Filippo D'Amico
Daniele D'Anza
Alberto D'Aversa
Fabrizio De Angelis
Andrea De Carlo
Ennio De Concini
Luciano De Crescenzo
Eduardo De Filippo
Elsa De Giorgi
Raimondo Del Balzo
Ubaldo Maria Del Colle
Giuseppe De Liguoro
Wladimiro De Liguoro
Peter Del Monte
Renato De Maria
Alberto De Martino
Leonardo De Mitri
Ruggero Deodato
Raffaele De Ritis
Francesco De Robertis
Giannetto De Rossi
Corrado D'Errico
Giuseppe De Santis
Vittorio De Seta
Christian De Sica
Manuel De Sica
Vittorio De Sica
Vittorio De Sisti
Roberto D'Ettorre Piazzoli
Enzo Di Gianni
Fernando Di Leo
Carlo Di Palma
Alessandro Di Robilant
Rino Di Silvestro
Marco Di Tillo
Ignazio Dolce
Carlo Duse
Vittorio Duse

E

Luciano Emmer
Luciano Ercoli

F

Aldo Fabrizi
Roberto Faenza
Giovanni Fago
Dino Falconi
Ugo Falena
Corrado Farina
Felice Farina
Giuseppe Fatigati
Massimo Felisatti
Federico Fellini
Riccardo Fellini
Giuseppe Ferlito
Davide Ferrario
Marco Ferreri
Franco Ferrini
Ignazio Ferronetti
Giorgio Ferroni
Alberto Festa
Pasquale Festa Campanile
Demofilo Fidani
Enzo Fiermonte
Armando Fizzarotti
Ettore Maria Fizzarotti
Dario Fo
Marcello Fondato
Giovacchino Forzano
Clemente Fracassi
Claudio Fragasso
Gianni Franciolini
Massimo Franciosa
Pietro Francisci
Mario Franco
Riccardo Freda
Lucio Fulci

G

Daniele Gaglianone
Giovanna Gagliardo
Carmine Gallone
Daniele Gangemi
Mario Gariazzo
Mario Garriba
Matteo Garrone
Riccardo Garrone
Sergio Garrone
Alessandro Gassman
Vittorio Gassman
Ernesto Gastaldi
Giuseppe Mario Gaudino
Augusto Genina
Giacomo Gentilomo
Pietro Germi
Alfredo Giannetti
Ettore Giannini
Gibba
Marco Tullio Giordana
Claudio Giorgi
Attilio Giovannini
Franco Giraldi
Enzo Girolami
Marino Girolami
Romolo Girolami
Roberto Girometti
Valeria Golino
Claudio Gora
Enrico Gras
Ernesto Grassi
Paolo Grassi
Emidio Greco
Ezio Greggio
Ugo Gregoretti
Sergio Grieco
Aldo Grimaldi
Antonello Grimaldi
Aurelio Grimaldi
Gianni Grimaldi
Luca Guadagnino
Giovanni Guareschi
Alfredo Guarini
Giuseppe Guarino
Enrico Guazzoni
Mino Guerrini
Guidarino Guidi
Gabriel Cash

H
Paolo Heusch
Terence Hill

I

Angelo Iacono
Ivo Illuminati
Mario Imperoli
Stefano Incerti
Franco Indovina
Alex Infascelli
Carlo Infascelli
Fiorella Infascelli
Ciccio Ingrassia
Ciro Ippolito
Simona Izzo

J

Gualtiero Jacopetti
Valerio Jalongo

L

Wilma Labate
Aldo Lado
Mario Landi
Mario Lanfranchi
Alberto Lattuada
Francesco Laudadio
Mariano Laurenti
Gabriele Lavia
Gianfrancesco Lazotti
Gavino Ledda
Umberto Lenzi
Sergio Leone
Roberto Leoni
Antonio Leonviola
Marco Leto
Enzo Liberti
Luciano Ligabue
Piero Livi
Carlo Lizzani
Franco Lo Cascio
Giovanni Lombardo Radice
Leo Longanesi
Nanni Loy
Daniele Luchetti
Maurizio Lucidi
Michele Lupo

M

Mauro Macario
Ruggero Maccari
Giulio Macchi
Luigi Magni
Antonio Maria Magro
Anton Giulio Majano
Curzio Malaparte
Nunzio Malasomma
Guido Malatesta
Luigi Malerba
Luca Manfredi
Nino Manfredi
Giulio Manfredonia
Nicola Manzari
Dacia Maraini
Lucio Marcaccini
Romolo Marcellini
Siro Marcellini
Marcello Marchesi
Franco Maresco
Antonio Margheriti
Giorgio Mariuzzo
Vincenzo Marra
Renzo Martinelli
Luciano Martino
Sergio Martino
Nino Martoglio
Mario Martone
Francesco Maselli
Mario Massa
Aristide Massaccesi
Francesco Massaro
Stelvio Massi
Camillo Mastrocinque
Antonello Matarazzo
Raffaello Matarazzo
Bruno Mattei
Mario Mattòli
Roberto Mauri
Carlo Mazzacurati
Lorenza Mazzetti
Massimo Mazzucco
Leo Menardi
Pino Mercanti
Raffaele Mertes
Vittorio Metz
Riccardo Milani
Gianfranco Mingozzi
Felice Minotti
Mario Missiroli
Federico Moccia
Giuseppe Moccia
Domenico Modugno
Paolo Moffa
Flavio Mogherini
Antonio Monda
Mario Monicelli
Giuliano Montaldo
Indro Montanelli
Luigi Montefiori
Enzo Monteleone
Enrico Montesano
Adriana Monti
Beni Montresor
Nanni Moretti
Mario Morra
Giorgio Moser
Gabriele Muccino
Edoardo Mulargia
Vincenzo Musolino

N

Nico Naldini
Armando Nannuzzi
Gian Gaspare Napolitano
Sergio Nasca
Piero Natoli
Anna Negri
Alberto Negrin
Baldassarre Negroni
Maurizio Nichetti
Giancarlo Nicotra
Stanislao Nievo
Salvatore Nocita
Nick Nostro
Elvira Notari
Francesco Nuti
Paolo Nuzzi

O

Luciano Odorisio
Enrico Oldoini
Ermanno Olmi
Oscar Orefici
Giuseppe Orlandini
Valentino Orsini
Ferzan Özpetek

P

Antonello Padovano
Marcello Pagliero
Amleto Palermi
Giorgio Panariello
Gianfranco Pannone
Domenico Paolella
Giulio Paradisi
Neri Parenti
Gianfranco Parolini
Francesco Pasinetti
Pier Paolo Pasolini
Uberto Pasolini
Sergio Pastore
Giovanni Pastrone
Giuseppe Patroni Griffi
Livio Pavanelli
Pier Ludovico Pavoni
Riccardo Pazzaglia
Glauco Pellegrini
Lucio Pellegrini
Ivo Perilli
Memè Perlini
Sandro Petraglia
Elio Petri
Giulio Petroni
Gianfranco Piccioli
Giuseppe Piccioni
Leonardo Pieraccioni
Piero Pierotti
Antonio Pietrangeli
Paolo Pietrangeli
Pier Francesco Pingitore
Massimo Pirri
Salvatore Piscicelli
Nicola Pistoia
Fabio Pittorru
Michele Placido
Ferdinando Maria Poggioli
Gian Luigi Polidoro
Leone Pompucci
Gillo Pontecorvo
Marco Ponti
Maurizio Ponzi
Antonella Ponziani
Pasquale Pozzessere
Renato Pozzetto
Franco Prosperi
Francesco Prosperi
Giorgio Prosperi
Gianni Puccini
Massimo Pupillo

Q

Pino Quartullo
Giulio Questi
Folco Quilici

R

Ubaldo Ragona
Simone Rapisarda Casanova
Filippo Walter Ratti
Piero Regnoli
Pina Renzi
Tonino Ricci
Gennaro Righelli
Davide Riondino
Claudio Risi
Dino Risi
Marco Risi
Nelo Risi
Antonello Riva
Alfredo Rizzo
Alfredo Robert
Roberto Roberti
Giuseppe Rocca
Alice Rohrwacher
Luca Ronconi
Brunello Rondi
Gian Luigi Rondi
Francesco Rosi
Gian Paolo Rosmino
Nello Rossati
Renzo Rossellini
Roberto Rossellini
Franco Rossetti
Francesco Rosi
Salvatore Rosso
Luigi Rovere
Sergio Rubini
Antonio Rubino

S

Vittorio Sala
Corso Salani
Luciano Salce
Vincenzo Salemme
Enrico Maria Salerno
Gabriele Salvatores
Jack Salvatori
Francesco Salvi
Guido Salvini
Salvatore Samperi
Walter Santesso
Giancarlo Santi
Leopoldo Savona
Massimo Scaglione
Maurizio Scaparro
Umberto Scarpelli
Luigi Scattini
Aldo Scavarda
Romano Scavolini
Franco Scepi
Riccardo Schicchi
Mario Schifano
Tito Schipa jr
Piero Schivazappa
Maurizio Sciarra
Pasquale Scimeca
Ettore Scola
Giuseppe Maria Scotese
Luciano Secchi
Mario Serandrei
Gustavo Serena
Enzo Siciliano
Mario Siciliano
Giorgio Simonelli
Giovanni Simonelli
Renato Simoni
Vittorio Sindoni
Umberto Smaila
Michele Soavi
Mario Soldati
Silvio Soldini
Sergio Sollima
Stefano Sollima
Alberto Sordi
Paolo Sorrentino
Paolo Spinola
Pasquale Squitieri
Sergio Staino
Giorgio Strehler

T

Gino Talamo
Michele Massimo Tarantini
Anna Maria Tatò
Elda Tattoli
Gianluca Maria Tavarelli
Paolo Taviani
Vittorio Taviani
Vittorio Tedesco Zammarano
Piero Tellini
Duccio Tessari
Sergio Tofano
Maria Sole Tognazzi
Ricky Tognazzi
Ugo Tognazzi
Giuseppe Tornatore
Roberta Torre
Gianni Toti
Luciano Tovoli
Fausto Tozzi
Enzo Trapani
Luis Trenker
Leopoldo Trieste
Massimo Troisi
Marco Turco
Carlo Tuzii

V

Tonino Valerii
Gino Valori
Florestano Vancini
Carlo Vanzina
Stefano Vanzina
Giuseppe Vari
Maurizio Vasco
Turi Vasile
Dino Verde
Carlo Verdone
Aldo Vergano
Giovanni Veronesi
Marco Vicario
Piero Vida
Paolo Virzì
Eriprando Visconti
Luchino Visconti
Piero Vivarelli
Mario Volpe

W

Lina Wertmüller
Fulvio Wetzl
Edoardo Winspeare

Z

Pino Zac
Maurizio Zaccaro
Giancarlo Zagni
Gero Zambuto
Luigi Zampa
Mario Zampi
Gianni Zanasi
Cesare Zavattini
Franco Zeffirelli
Primo Zeglio
Italo Zingarelli
Giuseppe Zucca
Piero Zuffi
Valerio Zurlini

See also
 List of Italian actors
 List of Italian actresses

References

Film directors
Italy